Joseph C. Burger was a United States Marine Corps officer and college athlete.

Joseph Burger may also refer to:

Joseph Burger (Medal of Honor), Austrian German soldier and Medal of Honor recipient in the American Civil War
Joseph Burger House in Mechanicsville Village Historic District

See also
Joseph Berger (disambiguation)